Russia has competed at the Paralympic Games as different teams in its history. The nation competed as part of the Soviet Union at the 1988 Summer and Winter Games, while after the dissolution of the Soviet Union in 1991, Russia competed as part of the Unified Team in 1992. The nation competed for a first time as Russia at the 1994 Winter Paralympics, and after that participated in every summer and winter edition up until the 2014 Winter Paralympics.

Doping bans
On 7 August 2016, the Russian Paralympic Committee was banned from participating in the 2016 Summer Paralympics and the 2018 Winter Paralympics due to the doping scandal in Russia, although in 2018 they were allowed to compete as the Neutral Paralympic Athletes. The decision to ban the entire Russian team contrasts the treatment of the Russian Olympic team during the 2016 Summer Olympics, whose members could compete if they were allowed by their sport's respective governing body.

On 9 December 2019, the World Anti-Doping Agency (WADA) banned Russia from all international sport for four years, after it was found that data provided by the Russian Anti-Doping Agency had been manipulated by Russian authorities with a goal of protecting athletes involved in its state-sponsored doping scheme. Russian athletes would be allowed to participate in the Paralympic under a neutral flag and with a neutral designation.

Russia later appealed against the WADA decision in the CAS. On 17 December 2020, the CAS announced its decision, reducing the suspension to two years and allowing Russian athletes to participate under the flag of the Russian Paralympic Committee, rather than under a neutral flag, and use the Russian national colours. For all victory ceremonies, Pyotr Tchaikovsky's Piano Concerto No. 1 will be used in lieu of the Russian national anthem.

2022 ban for invasion of Ukraine

After the 2022 Russian invasion of Ukraine, the International Olympic Committee (IOC) condemned Russia's "breach of the Olympic Truce adopted by the UN General Assembly".  Following this, the International Paralympic Committee on 3 March 2022 banned Russian athletes from competing at the 2022 Winter Paralympics.

Medal tables

Medals by Summer Games

Medals by Winter Games

See also
 Russian Paralympic Committee
 Russia at the Olympics

References